Metros de Santiago is a professional basketball team based in Santiago de los Caballeros, Santiago, Dominican Republic. The team currently plays in the Dominican top division Liga Nacional de Baloncesto.

Championships
Liga Nacional de Baloncesto  (5x) 
2006, 2007, 2014, 2015, 2017

References

Basketball teams established in 2005
Basketball teams in the Dominican Republic